The Men's sprint event of the Biathlon World Championships 2013 was held on February 9, 2013 at 13:00 local time.

Results

References

Men's sprint